Anthocorini is a tribe of minute pirate bugs in the family Anthocoridae. There are more than 30 described species in Anthocorini.

Genera
BioLib includes the following in tribe Anthocorini:
 Acompocoris Reuter, 1875 i c g b
 Anthocoris Fallen, 1814 i c g b
 Coccivora McAtee & Malloch, 1925 i c g b
 Dufouriellus Kirkaldy, 1906
 Elatophilus Reuter, 1884 i c g b
 Galchana Distant, 1910
 Macrotrachelia Reuter, 1871
 Melanocoris Champion, 1900 i c g b
 Temnostethus Fieber, 1860 i c g b
 Tetraphleps Fieber, 1860 i c g b
 †Xyloesteles Popov & Herczek, 2011
Data sources: i = ITIS, c = Catalogue of Life, g = GBIF, b = Bugguide.net

References

Further reading

External links

 

Anthocoridae
Articles created by Qbugbot
Hemiptera tribes